Thomas P. Gilmartin was a former member of the Ohio House of Representatives.

References

1924 births
2012 deaths
Members of the Ohio House of Representatives
Politicians from Youngstown, Ohio